Shuzhendong Chinese Typewriter is the first Chinese animation ever made in 1922 by Wan Laiming and Wan Guchan. Since it's not found yet, This piece of history could be classified as lost media.

Translations
There are two possible translations.  The first translation is "Comfortably Raised Eastern Chinese Typewriter", likely a generic marketing name.

The second translation maybe "Comfortable Zhendong Chinese Typewriter" as in the town of Zhendong (振东) in the Binhai county located in the Jiangsu province. Zhendong happens to be directly north of Shanghai, where the pioneering Wan brothers were doing animation experiments at the time.

History
The black and white advertisement was created for the Shanghai Commercial Press (商务印书馆).  It was a printing establishment setup in 1902.  By 1919 the Wan brothers were experimenting with animation technologies from the United States, and this commercial piece is the first known animation with a practical use outside their research.

See also
History of Chinese Animation
Chinese Animation

References

External links
 China Movie DB

Chinese animated films
1922 animated films
1922 films
Chinese silent films
Chinese black-and-white films